Kergunyah is a locality in north eastern Victoria. At the 2016 census Kergunyah had a population of 215.

The town is a centre for (mainly) dairy farms and includes a post office agent, caravan park and general store, community hall and Uniting Church.  The Kergunyah Streamside Reserve is a popular swimming area on a bend in the Kiewa River.  

The town was home to the Kergunyah Football Club which was established in 1923. They competed in leagues including the Allans Flat District Football Association, the Yackandandah Football Association, the "Dederang and District Football Association and the Tallangatta and District Football League. They won Tallangatta and District Football League premierships in 1955, 1956, 1957. They folded in 1975 after dwindling numbers. After folding, a number of former players met to form a new club with Kergunyah being the Origins for the Wodonga Raiders.

References

External links

Towns in Victoria (Australia)
Shire of Indigo